KUSJ (105.5 FM) is a radio station broadcasting a country music format. Licensed to Harker Heights, Texas, United States, the station serves the Killeen-Temple radio market. The station is currently owned by Townsquare Media.  The station's studios are located in Temple, and its transmitter is located south of Stillhouse Hollow Lake in unincorporated Bell County.

History
The station went on the air as KIXS on 1987-04-09. On 1990-08-03, the station changed its call sign to KLFX, on 1994-10-26 to KLTX, on 1996-04-24 to KNRV, on 1997-04-11 to KYUL, and on 2000-04-19 to the current KUSJ. The station broadcasts from studios located in Temple, Texas.

The morning show is hosted by Jamie Garrett and Brenda Price, the afternoon/evening show is hosted by Vicki. The evening show is CMT Radio Live. On Sunday mornings, the shows are American Country Countdown (hosted by Kix Brooks) and New Music Nashville.

References

External links
The morning show is hosted by Julia Connor and Jack Hammer.

USJ
Townsquare Media radio stations